The discography of The Muppets, an American puppet group originally created by puppeteer Jim Henson, includes of fifteen studio albums, four compilation albums, one extended play, eight singles, two "featured artist" singles and five music videos. Of the studio and compilation albums, three are soundtracks from seasons of The Muppet Show and seven of eight motion pictures. The soundtrack to the sixth film, Muppets from Space was orchestral as opposed to derivative compositions performed by the characters. Walt Disney Records has served as the primary record label for musical projects by The Muppets since 2004.

The Muppets are also known for numerous songs from their films and television series, some of which, including "Rainbow Connection", "Bein' Green", "The Muppet Show Theme" and their rendition of "Mah Nà Mah Nà", have become a prevalent part of contemporary pop culture, with several adaptations from other artists of varying genres. Not all discography has been performed by the group as an ensemble cast; some characters such as Kermit the Frog and Dr. Teeth and The Electric Mayhem, have gone on to perform solo compositions.

Studio albums

Compilation albums

EPs

Singles 

Notes:

Music videos

Other appearances

See also
Sesame Street discography
List of The Muppets productions

Footnotes

References

Discographies of American artists
Film and television discographies
Discography